Mu Velorum (μ Vel, μ Velorum) is a binary star system in the southern constellation Vela. The two stars orbit each other with a semi-major axis of 1.437 arcseconds and a period of 116.24 years. (Wulff-Dieter Heintz (1986) lists a period of 138 years with his orbital elements.) The pair have a combined apparent visual magnitude of 2.69, making the system readily visible to the naked eye. From parallax measurements, the distance to this system is estimated to be . The system is about 360 million years old.

The primary component is a giant star with an apparent magnitude of 2.7 and a stellar classification of G5 III. It is radiating about 107 times the luminosity of the Sun from an expanded atmosphere about 13 times the Sun's radius. The mass of this star is 3.3 times that of the Sun. In 1998, the Extreme Ultraviolet Explorer space telescope detected a strong flare that released an X-ray emission nearly equal to the output of the entire star.

The fainter companion, Mu Velorum B, is a main sequence star with an apparent magnitude of 6.4 and an assigned stellar classification of G2V. However, this classification is suspect. Closer examination of the spectrum suggests the star may actually have a classification of F4V or F5V, which suggests a mass of about 1.5 times the mass of the Sun. Such stars typically do not show a marked level of magnetic activity.

References

Velorum, Mu
Vela (constellation)
Binary stars
G-type giants
G-type main-sequence stars
4216
093497
052727
Durchmusterung objects